Wilfried Sock (born 2 July 1944) is a German former ice hockey player, who competed for SG Dynamo Weißwasser. He played for the East Germany national ice hockey team at the 1968 Winter Olympics in Grenoble.

References 

1944 births
Living people
German ice hockey defencemen
Ice hockey players at the 1968 Winter Olympics
Olympic ice hockey players of East Germany
People from Weißwasser
Sportspeople from Saxony